Arild Gulden (born 4 December 1941) was a Norwegian former international handball and football player.

Handball career 
Gulden made his Norway men's national handball team debut in 1958, and played 52 matches at that level from 1958 to 1971. He participated at the 1961, 1964 and 1967 World Men's Handball Championship.

With the club SK Arild he won the Norwegian indoor championship in 1958.

He played between 1963 and 1970 and again between 1972 and 1977 for the Grasshopper Club Zürich. He won nine indoor championships.

Football career 
Gulden was capped nine times while with team Norway. He was with FK Lyn when they won the 1964 1. divisjon.

He played only in the Norwegian winter break for Grasshopper Club Zürich. He won with the Grasshoppers nine indoor championships.

References

1941 births
Living people 
Norwegian footballers
Norwegian male handball players
Association football midfielders
Norway international footballers
Lyn Fotball players
Expatriate handball players
Norwegian expatriate footballers
Norwegian expatriate sportspeople in Switzerland
Expatriate footballers in Switzerland
Sportspeople from Oslo